Jigar Shah (born August 30, 1974) is the director of the Loan Programs Office in the US Department of Energy. Shah gained prominence as an American clean energy entrepreneur, author and podcast host. Shah is known for work to create and advocate for market-driven solutions to climate change. He authored the book Creating Climate Wealth: Unlocking the Impact Economy, published in 2013.

Shah maintains that climate wealth is created when mainstream investors team up with entrepreneurs, corporations, mainstream capital, and governments at scale to solve the big problems of our time while generating compelling financial returns – not concessionary returns.

Early life

Born in India, Shah moved to the United States with his family when he was one year old. Shah moved to Sterling, Illinois when he was eight years old.

Shah has attended public school from elementary school through his Masters. Shah holds a B.S. in Mechanical Engineering from the University of Illinois, Champaign-Urbana, and an MBA from the University of Maryland.

Business initiatives
Shah is the co-founder and President of Generate Capital. Shah founded SunEdison in 2003, where he pioneered “no money down solar” and unlocked a multi-billion-dollar solar market, creating what was largest solar services company worldwide. The company simplified solar as a service through the implementation of the power purchase agreement (PPA) business model. That model changed the status quo, allowing organizations to purchase solar energy services under long-term predictably priced contracts and avoid the significant capital costs of ownership and operation of solar energy systems. Shah sold SunEdison in 2008.

Shah is author of Creating Climate Wealth: Unlocking the Impact Economy.  The book talks about the prominent role of business model innovation, more than new technology, in attracting mainstream capital and unlocking transformational change. In the book, the author pictures reaching our 2020 climate change goals as means to create the next economy with the equivalent of 100,000 companies worldwide, each generating $100 million in sales. Shah argues that, while new technical innovation is valuable, deployment of existing technologies are the key to reaching our near-term climate targets.

He cofounded Carbon War Room with Richard Branson and Virgin United, an organization that worked to harness the power of entrepreneurship to deploy solution technologies at scale. He served as CEO from 2009 to 2012.

Shah previously worked in strategy for BP Solar and as a contractor for the Department of Energy on alternative vehicles and fuel cell programs.

Shah has called to end all energy subsidies, including those for renewable energy, to "create a level playing field." He has donated repeatedly to the Climate Hawks Vote Political Action Super PAC since 2016 per FEC records.

The Energy Gang
Shah was a founding co-host of The Energy Gang, a podcast dedicated to exploring the technological, political and market forces driving energy and environmental issues. On a 2017 episode, Shah introduced the Jigar Shah Rule - "Countries should not have stupid policy".  As noted by co-host Stephen Lacey, the new ruling is pulled directly from the Jigar Shah Playbook, which suggests you must have competitive options such as volumetric reductions and feed-in tariffs, and the way these were designed seven to eight years ago do not work.

Loan Programs Office 
Energy Secretary Jennifer Granholm appointed Shah to direct the United States Department of Energy's Loan Programs Office in March 2021. The office provides $40 billion in loan authority to early-stage energy companies and climate technologies.

References

External links
Jigar Shah's blog at Huffington Post
 Creating Climate Wealth // Amazon

Climate activists
HuffPost writers and columnists
Living people
American environmentalists
Environmental bloggers
1974 births
American bloggers
American chief executives
Energy economists
Appropriate technology advocates
Green thinkers
People associated with solar power
Businesspeople from Washington, D.C.
American nonprofit executives
21st-century American businesspeople
Renewable energy commercialization
Environmental ethics
People associated with Greenpeace
People from Aravalli district
People from Sterling, Illinois